Robert John "Chip" Dunham (b. La Crosse, Wisconsin) is a cartoonist best known as the creator of the comic strip Overboard, which debuted in 1990.

The strip - which tells the comical tale of a group of pirates - is distributed through Universal Press Syndicate. In 1993, the National Cartoonist Society nominated Overboard for Best Comic Strip.

Chip attended Crestwood High School in Dearborn Heights, Michigan, graduating in 1971. In high school, he was known for his writing talent.

In 1980, he received a journalism degree from the University of Wisconsin–Madison; he lives in Beverly Hills, Michigan.

External links
 Chip Dunham Overboard Factsheet
 Chip Dunham - Lambiek summary
 Chip Dunham interview

Living people
American comic strip cartoonists
People from Beverly Hills, Michigan
People from La Crosse, Wisconsin
University of Wisconsin–Madison School of Journalism & Mass Communication alumni
Year of birth missing (living people)